Glen Garioch distillery (pronounced "Geery" in the Doric dialect of Aberdeen) is one of the oldest whisky distilleries in Scotland, dating back to 1797.

History
The location chosen by John & Alexander Manson for their malt whisky distillery in 1797 was an obvious one. Oldmeldrum in the celebrated 'Valley of the Garioch' was named "The Granary of Aberdeenshire", famous for producing the finest barley in all of Scotland.

The distillery, which originally incorporated a brewery and tannery, stands on the very edge of the town Oldmeldrum in Aberdeenshire. The location is known as ‘the granary of Aberdeenshire’, where barley and crystal springs have been abundant for over a thousand years, so it is not surprising that Glen Garioch Distillery was established as early as 1794 — one of the oldest operating distilleries in Scotland.

In 1968 the production of Glen Garioch was suspended on account of 'chronic water shortages'; however, in 1972 a manager was appointed with a brief to find another water source.  A spring was discovered on a neighbouring farm.  It came to be called ‘The Silent Spring’ as it could neither be seen nor heard.

Leading with the 1797 Founder’s Reserve at the heart of the range, Glen Garioch will periodically release hand selected individual batches of stock. Launched as ‘Single Batch Releases’, the first will be the Glen Garioch 1990 Vintage and the Glen Garioch 1978 Vintage which will join the 1797 Founder’s Reserve.

It is operated by Morrison Bowmore Distillers, which is owned by the Japanese company Beam Suntory.

See also
 List of whisky distilleries in Scotland
 List of historic whisky distilleries

Notes

References

External links
Glen Garioch distillery

Distilleries in Scotland
Scottish malt whisky